Karl-Heinz Hopp (20 November 1936 – 11 February 2007) was a German rower who competed for the United Team of Germany in the 1960 Summer Olympics.

Hopp was born in Allenstein, which is today called Olsztyn situated in Poland.

At the 1958 European Rowing Championships in Poznań, he won a gold medal with the coxless four. At the 1959 European Rowing Championships in Mâcon, he won a gold medal with the eight. At the 1960 Summer Olympics, he was a crew member of the German eight that won gold. At the 1961 European Rowing Championships in Prague, he won a gold medal with the coxed four.

After rowing, Hopp swapped to pentathlon and most enjoyed the equestrian part. He became a vet and had a large horse stable with his wife. He died in Lübeck on 11 February 2007.

References

1936 births
2007 deaths
Olympic rowers of the United Team of Germany
Rowers at the 1960 Summer Olympics
Olympic gold medalists for the United Team of Germany
Sportspeople from Olsztyn
Olympic medalists in rowing
People from East Prussia
West German male rowers
Medalists at the 1960 Summer Olympics
European Rowing Championships medalists
20th-century German people